Jovica Damjanović (born 11 December 1975) is a retired Serbian football midfielder.

References

1975 births
Living people
Serbian footballers
Apollon Smyrnis F.C. players
Kallithea F.C. players
Association football midfielders
Super League Greece players
Serbian expatriate footballers
Expatriate footballers in Greece
Serbian expatriate sportspeople in Greece